Basket Recanati is an Italian basketball team from the town of Recanati.

Honours

Domestic competitions
Serie B 
 Winners (1): 2009–2010

Notable players
  Isaiah Sykes (2014–2015)
  William Mosley  (2014–2015)
  Ryan Pettinella (2013–2014)
  Andrea Traini (2012, 2015–present)
  Dimitri Lauwers (2014–present)

External links
  

1982 establishments in Italy
Basketball teams established in 1982
Basketball teams in the Marche